Éric Girardin (born 12 February 1961) is a French politician of La République En Marche! (LREM) who has been serving as a member of the French National Assembly since the 2017 elections, representing the department of Marne.

Political career
In parliament, Girardin serves as member of the Committee on Foreign Affairs. In addition to his committee assignments, he is a member of the French-Mexican Parliamentary Friendship Group and the French-German Parliamentary Friendship Group. Since 2019, he has also been a member of the French delegation to the Franco-German Parliamentary Assembly.

Political positions
In July 2019, Girardin decided not to align with his parliamentary group's majority and became one of 52 LREM members who abstained from a vote on the French ratification of the European Union’s Comprehensive Economic and Trade Agreement (CETA) with Canada.

See also
 2017 French legislative election

References

1961 births
Living people
Deputies of the 15th National Assembly of the French Fifth Republic
La République En Marche! politicians
Place of birth missing (living people)
Deputies of the 16th National Assembly of the French Fifth Republic
Members of Parliament for Marne